Ruby Turner Live at Glastonbury is the first live album by British soul singer Ruby Turner, released in 1995. Chronologically this fits in as her second recording – it was recorded on Stage One at Glastonbury on 20 June for BBC's in Concert in 1986.

Track listing
"Get on Without You"
"Sexy"
"Feel My Love" (John Darville, Ray Turner)
"If You're Ready (Come Go with Me)" (Homer Banks, Carl Hampton, Ray Jackson)
"I'd Rather Go Blind" (Bill Foster, Ellington Jordan)
"Either Way You Lose"
"On Fire"
"Easy on Yourself"
"Only Women Bleed" (Alice Cooper, Dick Wagner)
"Blue Monday" (Dave Bartholomew, Fats Domino)

Personnel

Musicians
Ruby Turner – vocals, backing vocalsCate Shanks

Ruby Turner albums
1995 live albums